Acontias orientalis, the Eastern striped blindworm or Eastern Cape legless skink, is a species of lizard in the family Scincidae. It is endemic to South Africa.

References

Acontias
Reptiles described in 1938
Reptiles of South Africa
Endemic fauna of South Africa
Taxa named by John Hewitt (herpetologist)